Albert Goutal (1 December 1918– 2 May 2009) was a French cyclist. Professional 1938 to 1952, he won the French National Road Race Championships in the occupied area in 1941.

Palmarès
1941
French National Road Race Championships in the occupied zone
2nd of Paris–Tours
2nd of Bordeaux-Angoulême
3rd of the National Criterium - occupied zone
1942
5th stage b Circuit France
Hillclimb Ménilmontant
1949
6th stage of the Tour of Algeria
1950
2nd stage of the Circuit of Gold Coast
2nd Circuit Côte d'Or

Results on the major tours

Tour de France
1939: DNF

References

1918 births
2009 deaths
French male cyclists
Cyclists from Loire-Atlantique